Sir George Clement Martin  (11 September 1844 – 21 February 1916) was an English  organist, who served at St Paul's Cathedral.

Background

Martin was born in Lambourn, Berkshire on 11 September 1844. John Footman's 1894 history of Lambourn Church describes him as "the only native of Lambourn who has ever risen to fame".

His interest in music began after he heard Sir Herbert Oakeley play Bach in Lambourn. He studied organ under John Stainer, supposedly cycling from Lambourn to Oxford daily for his studies. In June 1868 he matriculated at New College, Oxford, and a few days later was awarded a B.Mus. degree.

Martin died 21 February 1916, in London. He has a memorial plaque in Lambourn church near the organ.

Career

Sub-organist at St Paul's Cathedral 1876–1888

Organist of:

Lambourn Parish Church
Dalkeith for the Duke of Buccleuch in 1871 and St. Peter's, Edinburgh, briefly at the same time
St Paul's Cathedral 1888–1916

Works
Martin is perhaps best known for his hymn tune "St. Helen" (commonly used for the hymn "Lord, enthroned in heavenly splendour"). He was a composer, mostly of church music, which included a Te Deum in A, performed at the Thanksgiving Service held on the steps of the Cathedral in Queen Victoria's Diamond Jubilee year.

Martin transcribed Sir Edward Elgar's 1897 work "Imperial March" for organ, in which form it is still frequently played by many concert organists, often as an encore.  It is, in this form, possibly better known than in the original orchestral arrangement, which (outside England) is only occasionally performed - organist Simon Preston's 1964 recording on the organ of Westminster Abbey is one well-known version.

He also wrote a primer on "The Art of Training Choir Boys" which became a standard work on the subject.

Awards and honours
Martin was given a knighthood in the 1897 Diamond Jubilee Honours. He was appointed a Member (4th class) of the Royal Victorian Order in the November 1902 Birthday Honours list, and was invested with the insignia by King Edward VII at Buckingham Palace on 18 December 1902.

References

1844 births
1916 deaths
19th-century organists
20th-century organists
19th-century British composers
People from Lambourn
English organists
British male organists
Cathedral organists
Members of the Royal Victorian Order
Knights Bachelor
19th-century English musicians
20th-century English composers
19th-century British male musicians
20th-century British male musicians
Male classical organists